Donagh is a settlement in Prince Edward Island.

Donagh, an unincorporated area, is located in Queens County in the central portion of Prince Edward Island, SW. of Mount Stewart.

Communities in Queens County, Prince Edward Island